Das unsichtbare Visier (The Invisible Visor) was an East German television series, broadcast between 1973 and 1979. In its first and longest season it starred Armin Mueller-Stahl in the role of Werner Bredebusch, a Stasi agent active abroad under the alias Achim Detjen.

Cast
 Armin Mueller-Stahl: Werner Bredebusch/"Achim Detjen"
 Horst Schulze: Dr. Clemens
 Wolfgang Greese: SS officer Born
 Jessy Rameik: Winnie Winkelmann
 Helmut Schellhardt: Wendland
 Alfred Struwe: General von Wieseneck
 Wilfried Ortmann: Krösing
 Walter Niklaus: CIA agent Wilson
 Siegfried Loyda: Herzog
 Peter Groeger: Roloff
 Hannjo Hasse: Cliff
 Gunter Schoß: Martin Tanner
 Gerry Wolff: Don Salvatore
 Leon Niemczyk: Dr. König
 Marion van de Kamp: Felicitas Eichhofer

Broadcasts

See also
List of German television series

References

External links
 
 Series trailer on the official YouTube channel of ARD.

Television in East Germany
1973 German television series debuts
1979 German television series endings
Espionage television series
German-language television shows